The Non-Importation Act, passed by the United States Congress on April 18, 1806, forbid any kind of import of certain British goods in an attempt to coerce Britain to suspend its impressment of American sailors and to respect American sovereignty and neutrality. The Act was the first in a series of ineffective attempts of Congress and the administrations of President Thomas Jefferson and James Madison to respond economically, instead of militarily, to these British actions and to other consequences of the Napoleonic Wars. The Act was part of the chain of events leading to the War of 1812.

Background
During the Napoleonic Wars, British and to a lesser extent French interference with American shipping motivated Congress to action. As the United States was far weaker than either belligerent, economic warfare alternatives to military action were explored as possible means of leverage. Some in Congress favored full embargo, while other wanted more limited measures. After three months of debate, those calling for limited measures initially prevailed. Taking effect on November 15, 1806, the Act aimed to threaten Britain's prosperity by impeding trade, with an ultimate aim of motivating Britain to cease interfering with American shipping, which would relieve the United States of the self-inflicted consequences of enforcement.

Banned items
The following items were banned under the Non-Importation Act of 1806:
All articles of which leather, silk, hemp, flax, tin (except in sheets), or brass was the material of chief value
All woolen clothes whose invoice prices shall exceed 5/- sterling per square yard
Woolen hosiery of all kinds
Window, glass and glassware
Silver and plated goods
Paper
Nails
Spikes
Hats
Ready-made clothing
Playing cards
Beer, ale and porter
Pictures and prints

The penalties for infraction were a loss of the goods and a fine of three times their value.

Weakness
Dissident Congressman John Randolph described the law as "a milk-and-water bill, a dose of chicken-broth to be taken nine months hence". The list of banned British goods excluded those most important to trade. These items included cheap woolens, coal, iron, steel, and British colonial produce, all goods deemed too vital to embargo.

Enforcement
Britain did not change its policies or actions. Public protest soon forced the Act's suspension. President Jefferson was given the power to suspend it longer, and again did in March 1807.

Gallatin's contributions
Congress asked Treasury Secretary Albert Gallatin for advice. Gallatin complained that the bill was badly worded and lacked specificity. For instance, many accepted imported items come wrapped in paper, which was forbidden. Some banned materials, like silver, were used to create permitted goods, like watches. Gallatin felt the Act would raise more questions than it answered, and suggested an embargo could be administered more effectively.

Congress eventually responded to Gallatin's advice by passing a more prohibitive Act, the Embargo Act of 1807, as customs inspectors were noticing that other countries' ships were evading the law by delivering banned goods.

Replacement Acts
The Embargo Act of 1807 would prove to damage the American economy severely. It in turn was superseded by the Non-Intercourse Act of 1809 and subsequently Macon's Bill Number 2. All were clearly ineffective. Eventually the War of 1812 interrupted economic growth, mooting American economic warfare attempts.

See also
Embargo Act of 1807
Non-Intercourse Act (1809)
Macon's Bill Number 2
Origins of the War of 1812
Nonconsumption agreements

Notes

References
 Embargo Act of 1807 at Bartleby.com
 Heaton, Herbert. "Non-Importation, 1806-1812" The Journal of Economic History, Vol. 1, No. 2 Nov. 1941. Published by: Cambridge University Press of behalf of the Economic History Association. pp. 178–198.
 
 
 

1806 in American law
9th United States Congress
United States federal trade legislation